Mikhail "Misha" Goikhberg (born 24 November 1986), is a Russian-born Canadian race car driver who is best known for competing in the IMSA SportsCar Championship.

Early career 
Goikhberg's first foray into driving happened in 2003 at the Russian track of Nevskoye Kolzo (The Neva Ring) with a Lada Cup Car under guidance of experienced Russian race car driver Aleksandr Lvov. Goikhberg completed several seasons of regional karting in Canada, followed by enrollment into Skip Barber Racing School in 2008.

Open Wheel competition 
2009 saw Goikhberg competing with Brian Graham Racing in Ontario Formula Ford, where he finished 5th and 2nd amongst rookies. In 2010 Goikhberg signed with his current team JDC MotorSports, with which started a multi-year relationship. He competed in USF2000 claiming 3rd spot at the end of the year having won at Laguna Seca. In 2011 he drove a limited campaign in the Star Mazda Championship. Due to lack of sponsorship he only ran the rounds in Mosport and Sonoma. In 2019, he ran the SCCA June Sprints with Rice Race Prep in both a Formula Ford and Formula Continental. He won two races in the Formula Continental and one in the Formula F.

Sportscar Racing competition
In 2012 Goikhberg and JDC MotorSports decided to move into sportscar racing teaming up for a full season in the IMSA Prototype Lites Championship. The Russian driver won 2 rounds and finished 2nd overall in 2012, followed by a 3rd overall finish in 2013, and finally claimed the championship in 2014 in a commanding fashion winning 9 rounds including 6 pole positions. Goikhberg won the $100000 Mazda Road to the 24 scholarship and moved up to the Tudor United SportsCar Championship with JDC-Miller MotorSports in 2015. 2015 was a challenging rookie year for Goikhberg, who finished 4th overall in the driver championship claiming 3 podiums at Daytona, Detroit and Canadian Tire Motorsport Park.

In 2016 Goikhberg teamed up with Stephen Simpson as his full season teammate. Driving again for  JDC-Miller MotorSports in the Prototype Challenge category of the WeatherTech Sportscar Championship, the pair has scored two victories, winning the Rolex 24 Hours of Daytona and the Long Beach Grand Prix. Goikhberg finished the 2016 season in 3rd position in the driver standings and has moved up to Prototype class for 2017 WeatherTech SportsCar Championship.

In 2018, Goikhberg and co-driver Simpson would swap rides, piloting the return of the No. 99 "Red Dragon" with sponsorship from GAINSCO/Bob Stallings Racing as JDC-Miller expanded to a second Oreca 07. and would win that year's 6 Hours of Watkins Glen, the first Prototype victory for JDC-Miller MotorSports.

In 2019 Goikhberg returned to the familiar # 85 JDC-Miller MotorSports entry with new teammate Tristan Vautier as the team moved for the first year to a Cadillac DPi-V.R. The Cadillac DPi-V.R is a prototype racing car which started competing in the IMSA WeatherTech SportsCar Championship in North America in 2017. With the switch to the IMSA DPi class Goikhberg will compete in the highest form of prototype sportscar racing in North America.

For 2020 Goikhberg will team up with Álvaro Parente in a full-season effort in the GT Daytona category. They will pilot the No. 57 Acura NSX GT3 Evo for Heinricher Racing with Meyer Shank. They will be joined for all four of the Michelin Endurance Cup races by Trent Hindman. A. J. Allmendinger will also join the lineup for the 24 Hours of Daytona.

Career statistics

Complete WeatherTech SportsCar Championship results
(key) (Races in bold indicate pole position) (Races in italics indicate fastest lap)

* Season still in progress.

References

External links
 JDC-Miller Motorsports
 Racing-Reference Misha Goikhberg
 Driver Database Mikhail Goikhberg

1986 births
Living people
Russian racing drivers
Canadian racing drivers
WeatherTech SportsCar Championship drivers
24 Hours of Daytona drivers
GT World Challenge America drivers
JDC Motorsports drivers
Meyer Shank Racing drivers
Lamborghini Squadra Corse drivers
US RaceTronics drivers